Around 190 hundred immigrants of Spanish origin, most of them day labourers working in the esparto harvest, were killed on 11 June 1881 in French Algeria (in the countryside around Saïda) by members of the insurgent movement led by Bou-Amama.

Development 

The Franco-Algerian Company hired day labourers across the impoverished Spanish South-East to work in the esparto harvest in Algeria offering passage and  travel to their families, although eventually day labourers were forced to pay for their travel and to buy their food at a company's store. Following the outbreak of a rebellion in Tunisia, the instability moved to Algeria in late April 1881, with Bou-Amama taking the lead of the movement against the French occupation. Then, on 11 June 1881, following the seizure of Khalfallah by insurgents, around 190 Spanish esparto harvesters (most of them from Almería, and the rest from Murcia and Alicante) were put to the sword in Khalfallah, in the surroundings of Saïda (to the south of Oran), whereas many of their wives were raped, while the attackers also made 600 hostages and set 100,000 quintals of esparto on fire. News about the event arrived to Oran (17 June) and then Spain (18 June). For the rest of June and July many naked and hungry Spaniards moved to Oran to get a passage back to Almería. About 10,000 immigrants were repatriated to Spain.

Bibliography 
Notes

Citations

Bibliography
 
 
 
 

1881 in Algeria
Massacres in 1881
June 1881 events
Algeria–Spain relations
Conflicts in 1881
Immigration to Africa
Massacres in Algeria
Mass murder in 1881
Spanish diaspora in Africa
Xenophobia in Africa